Clavering Windmills are  a pair of Grade II listed Tower mills in Clavering, Essex, England. They have both been converted to residential use. They are named North Mill and South Mill. A third mill existed in Clavering until the mid-nineteenth century, known as Clavering Mill.

History

Clavering Mill

Clavering Mill was a Post mill. It was marked on a map dated c.1625 and then in the ownership of Sir Francis Barrington. In 1702 it was conveyed to Sir Charles Barrington. The mill was marked on Warburton, Bland and Smyth’s map of 1724. It was marked on a plan of Clavering dated 1783 and also on the 1840 Tithe map of Clavering. White’s Directory of 1848 records three millers in Clavering, the last date at which the post mill can be assumed to have been standing.

North Mill

North Mill was built for James Pavitt in 1811, working in conjunction with the post mill until 1845. A  oil engine was installed in 1919 by Thomas Hunt, the Soham millwright. The sails were removed about this time, but the mill worked by the engine for many years.

South Mill

South Mill was built in 1757. The mill was idle in 1906, but then put back to work by its new owner, William Caton. It worked by wind until autumn 1919 and the sails were removed the following spring. No auxiliary power was provided, the mill working by wind alone.

Description

Clavering Mill

No details are known of this mill, although it would have had Common sails when built. It is not known whether there was a roundhouse or not.

North Mill

North Mill is a five-storey tower mill with a beehive cap, winded by a fantail. It had four Single Patent sails, which rotated clockwise. The Upright Shaft is wooden, as is the clasp arm Great Spur Wheel, which drove three pairs of millstones overdrift.

South mill

South Mill is a four-storey tower mill with a beehive cap with a gallery. It was winded by a fantail It had four Single Spring sails. The mill drove two pairs of  French Burr millstones.

Millers
Post
William Hill 1702 
Thomas Nottage 1802
James Pavitt 1804 - 1845

South
 Henry Salmon 1772 - 1804
Henry Moore 1840–1850
William Overill 1849
Zachariah Livings 1861 
 Robert Spencer 1871
William Caton 1906 - 1919

North
James Pavitt 1811–1845 
James Pavitt Jr 1845 - 1850
Spencer 1879
William Caton 1906 – 
A E Caton 1935

References for above:-

External links
Windmill World webpage on South Mill
Windmill World webpage on North Mill

References

Post mills in the United Kingdom
Tower mills in the United Kingdom
Grinding mills in the United Kingdom
Grade II listed buildings in Essex
Grade II listed windmills
Clavering, Essex